Leblanc, Louisiana may refer to the following places in the U.S. state of Louisiana:
LeBlanc, Louisiana, in Iberville Parish
Le Blanc, Louisiana, in Acadia Parish